The UCL Faculty of Mathematical and Physical Sciences is one of the 11 constituent faculties of University College London (UCL). The Faculty, the UCL Faculty of Engineering Sciences and the UCL Faculty of the Built Envirornment (The Bartlett) together form the UCL School of the Built Environment, Engineering and Mathematical and Physical Sciences.

Departments
The Faculty currently comprises the following departments:

UCL Department of Chemistry
UCL Department of Earth Sciences
UCL Department of Mathematics
Chalkdust is an online mathematics interest magazine published by Department of Mathematics students starting in 2015
UCL Department of Natural Sciences
UCL Department of Physics & Astronomy
UCL Department of Science and Technology Studies
UCL Department of Space & Climate Physics (Mullard Space Science Laboratory)
UCL Department of Statistical Science
London Centre for Nanotechnology - a joint venture between UCL and Imperial College London established in 2003 following the award of a £13.65m higher education grant under the Science Research Infrastructure Fund.

Research centres and institutes

The Faculty is closely involved with the following research centres and institutes:

UCL Centre for Materials Research
UCL Centre for Mathematics and Physics in the Life Sciences and Experimental Biology (CoMPLEX) - an inter-disciplinary virtual centre that seeks to bring together mathematicians, physical scientists, computer scientists and engineers upon the problems posed by complexity in biology and biomedicine. The centre works with 29 departments and Institutes across UCL. It has a MRes/PhD program that requires that its students also belong to at least one of these Departments/Institutes. The centre is based in the Physics Building on the UCL main campus.
Centre for Planetary Science at UCL/Birkbeck
UCL Clinical Operational Research Unit (CORU) - CORU sits within the Department of Mathematics and is a team of researchers dedicated to applying operational research, data analysis and mathematical modelling to problems in health care.
UCL Institute of Origins
UCL Institute for Healthcare Engineering (IHE) - IHE is dedicated to transforming lives through digital and medical technologies and fosters collaboration across UCL areas of expertise.
UCL Institute for Risk and Disaster Reduction
The Thomas Young Centre

Rankings
In the 2013 Academic Ranking of World Universities, UCL is ranked joint 51st to 75th in the world (and joint 12th in Europe) for Natural Sciences and Mathematics.

In the 2013 QS World University Rankings, UCL is ranked 38th in the world (and 12th in Europe) for Natural Sciences. In the 2014 QS World University Rankings by Subject, UCL is ranked joint 51st-100th in the world (and joint 12th in Europe) for Chemistry, joint 27th in the world (and 8th in Europe) for Earth & Marine Sciences, joint 51st-100th in the world (and joint 13th in Europe) for Materials Science, joint 36th in the world (and joint 10th in Europe) for Mathematics, 35th in the world (and 13th in Europe) for Physics & Astronomy, and 47th in the world (and 9th in Europe) for Statistics & Operational Research.

In the 2013/14 Times Higher Education World University Rankings, UCL is ranked 51st in the world (and 16th in Europe) for Physical Sciences.

Notable people
 Michael Abraham
 William Ramsay
 Steven T. Bramwell
 M. J. Seaton
 Sigurd Zienau
 Andrew Fisher
 Paul Davies
 Edwin Power
 Peter Higgs
 Otto Hahn
 Charles K. Kao
 Andrea Sella
Raman Prinja
Helen Wilson
Hannah Fry

See also
Birkbeck, University of London
Imperial College London

References

External links
UCL Faculty of Mathematical and Physical Sciences
UCL School of the Built Environment, Engineering and Mathematical and Physical Sciences 
University College London
CoMPLEX homepage

Departments of University College London
Research institutes in London
Complex systems theory
Mathematical institutes
Multidisciplinary research institutes